Mazaticol (Pentona) is an anticholinergic used as an antiparkinsonian agent in Japan.

References

External links 
 Government registered description of mazaticol (Pentona) (Japanese)

Antiparkinsonian agents
Muscarinic antagonists
Thiophenes
Carboxylate esters
Tertiary alcohols